Swiss Miss is a brand of ConAgra Foods, Inc.

Swiss Miss may also refer to:
 Heidi, an 1880 fictional orphaned Swiss girl
 Helvetia, the female personification of Switzerland
Swiss Miss (film), a 1938 film starring Laurel and Hardy
"Swiss Miss", a villain from Spider-Man: Turn Off the Dark
Martina Hingis (born 1980), retired professional tennis player from Switzerland
Vreneli, nickname for a range of legal tender gold coins produced in Switzerland
An episode of the animated TV series Archer
A musical composition by George Gershwin